Peter Stuursma (born January 29, 1971), is an American football coach. He is the head football coach at Hope College in Holland, Michigan, a position he has held since the 2016 season.

Head coaching record

College football

References

External links
 Hope profile

1971 births
Living people
American football running backs
Hope Flying Dutchmen football coaches
Hope Flying Dutchmen football players
Northern Colorado Bears football coaches
High school football coaches in Michigan
High school ice hockey coaches in the United States
University of Northern Colorado alumni